is a 1985 Japanese comedy directed by Seijun Suzuki and starring Kenichi Hagiwara. The film is based on the novel of the same name by Toshiyuki Kajiyama.

Plot
Umiemon (Kenichi Hagiwara) is a naniwa-bushi singer who travels with his wife to the United States in hopes of achieving fame and fortune.

Cast
 Kenichi Hagiwara as Umiemon
 Yūko Tanaka as Kozome Takonoya
 Kenji Sawada as Tetsugoro Osawa
 Akira Emoto as Ushiemon
 Chuck Wilson as Al Capone
 Hachiro Tako as Boss of beggars
 Kirin Kiki as Sene Tachikawa
 Haruko Kato as Wife
Shunsuke Kariya as Kondo
 Miki Takakura as Wife of an entertainer
 Tatsuo Umemiya as Hori

References

External links
 
 
 Capone Cries a Lot  at the Japanese Movie Database

1985 films
1980s Japanese-language films
Films based on Japanese novels
Films directed by Seijun Suzuki
1985 comedy films
Shochiku films
1980s Japanese films